The 2015–16 Iraqi Women's Football League was the first season of the Iraqi Women's Football League, which started on 25 April 2016 and ended on 19 July 2016. Ghaz Al-Shamal won the title coached by Qasim Jameel by beating Zeravani 1–0 in the final.

Group stage

North Group

Central Group

The Biladi–Al-Miqdadiya match originally ended 1–1 and was set to go to a penalty shootout, however Al-Miqdadiya refused to take penalties and Biladi were thus awarded a walkover victory.

Golden stage

Semi-finals

The Ghaz Al-Shamal–Al-Quwa Al-Jawiya match was 2–2 with five minutes left when Ghaz Al-Shamal were awarded a penalty. Al-Quwa Al-Jawiya players refused to continue the match in protest at the refereeing, therefore Ghaz Al-Shamal were awarded a walkover victory.

Third place match

Final

See also
 2015–16 Iraqi Premier League
 2015–16 Iraq Division One
 2015–16 Iraq FA Cup

References

External links
 Iraq Football Association

Iraqi Women's Football League seasons
Women's Football League